The 2022–23 Championnat National season is the 30th since the establishment of the Championnat National, and the 24th in its current format, which serves as third division of the French football league system. Two clubs will be promoted to Ligue 2 and six relegated after this season as adjustment for Ligue 1's reduction in size from 20 to 18 next season. As a result, no promotion play-offs are to be held.

Team changes 
Team changes from 2021–22 Championnat National.

To National
Promoted from 2021–22 Championnat National 2
Versailles
Martigues
Paris 13 Atletico
Le Puy
Relegated from 2021–22 Ligue 2
Dunkerque
Nancy

From National
Relegated to 2022–23 Championnat National 2
Sète
Chambly
Créteil
Boulogne
Promoted to 2022–23 Ligue 2
Laval
Annecy

Stadia and locations

Number of teams by regions

League table

Top scorers

References

Championnat National seasons
3
France